The Magic Mouse is a multi-touch wireless mouse that is manufactured by Foxconn and sold by Apple Inc.. The first-generation Magic Mouse was released on October 20, 2009, and introduced multi-touch functionality to a computer mouse. Taking after the iPhone, iPod Touch, and multi-touch MacBook trackpads, the Magic Mouse allows the use of multi-touch gestures and inertia scrolling across the surface of the mouse, designed for use with macOS.

The second-generation Magic Mouse (initially marketed as Magic Mouse 2) was released on October 13, 2015, removing the use of AA batteries, replacing it with a built-in lithium-ion rechargeable battery, and a Lightning port for charging and pairing, and was later made fully compatible with iPadOS.

Description 
The Magic Mouse connects wirelessly to a Mac computer via Bluetooth, with the second-generation additionally supporting iPads. The mouse is powered by two AA batteries, and is operated by a solid-state laser tracking sensor, like the previous-generation wireless Mighty Mouse. Apple includes two non-rechargeable batteries in the box. Until 2016, Apple sold a battery charger that includes two rechargeable NiMH AA batteries, designed for use with Mac peripherals, including the first-generation Magic Mouse.

Like its predecessor, the Mighty Mouse, the Magic Mouse includes support secondary click. The Magic Mouse has been included with most desktop Mac computers since its introduction, including the iMac, iMac Pro, and third-generation Mac Pro, as well as being available as a standalone purchase.

The Magic Mouse uses its acrylic multi-touch surface for 360-degree scrolling, replacing the rubber scroll ball on the Mighty Mouse. The mouse does not support left and right-clicking simultaneously, and also removes the ability to middle click without third-party software workarounds.

The Magic Mouse borrows design elements from the preceding Apple Pro Mouse, notably its seamless "zero-button" design and translucent acrylic surface.

The second-generation Magic Mouse was introduced in October 2015, alongside the Magic Keyboard and second-generation Magic Trackpad, and has since been made available in a large variety of colors. A space gray color was introduced with the iMac Pro in 2017, and was later made available as a standalone purchase. iPadOS 13.4 introduced mouse support to iPads for the first time, and supports all functionality of the second-generation Magic Mouse.

A variety of pastel colors were introduced in 2021 to match the colors of the M1 iMac. Additionally, standalone purchases now include a USB-C to Lightning cable, instead of USB-A to Lightning. The space gray color was replaced by a black color with a silver aluminum finish in 2022, which was originally only available bundled with the third-generation Mac Pro. All colors of the second-generation Magic Mouse have been introduced alongside matching colors for various Magic Keyboard models.

Reception

1st generation (A1296) 
Initial reception to the Magic Mouse was mixed, with reactions to its inability to trigger Exposé, Dashboard, or Spaces, as its predecessor could, or to middle click. Later versions of Mac OS X include gestures to open Mission Control, which incorporates functionality from Exposé, Dashboard, and Spaces. Other issues included the mouse's unstable connection to first-generation Mac Pro models, and its low-profile design being uncomfortable for some users.

2nd generation (A1657) 
The Lightning charging port is located on the bottom of the mouse, rendering it unusable while charging, a design choice that was widely criticized by critics. Critics have also noted the omission of Force Touch technology, compared to the second-generation Magic Trackpad.

Gallery

See also 
 Apple pointing devices
 Apple keyboards
 Apple Wireless Keyboard
 Magic Keyboard
 Magic Trackpad 2

References

Citations

Sources
 
 

Macintosh mice
Computer-related introductions in 2009
Computer-related introductions in 2015